Long-lying snow patches in Scotland have been noted from at least the 18th century, with snow patches on Ben Nevis being observed well into summer and autumn. Indeed, the summit observatory, which operated from 1883 to 1904, reported that snow survived on the north-east cliffs through more years than it vanished.

More recently, additional and methodical field study on the subject has been carried out by others, most notably by ecologist Dr Adam Watson. Most of this work concentrated on the mountains of north-east Scotland (in particular, the Cairngorms), but more recent observations by him and others has shed light on various locations throughout Scotland where long-lying snow persists. The available information systematically gathered by observers over the last 50 years or so, and greatly increased since the 1990s, has built up a level of knowledge that points to Scotland's snow patches being now amongst the best documented in the world.

General locations 

There are many locations on the Scottish mountains where snow lies regularly into July, August and even September, but the two main areas where snow virtually always lies longer than anywhere else are the Cairngorms and the Lochaber mountains.

In some years snow can persist all summer, in some locations lasting through to the next winter. In 2015 some 73 patches were still present in late November at a time when the next winter's snows had started accumulating. The last time so many patches had survived all year was 1994.

Other locations where snow has been known to survive:
 Creag Meagaidh hills, survived in 1994 and 2015
 Glen Affric/Strathfarrar hills, usually melts mid/late August but survivals have been noted on Sgurr na Lapaich, An Riabhachan and Toll Creagach as recently as 2015.
 Ben Wyvis, normally melts July/August, though survival has been noted (A Watson)
 Grey Corries, normally survives until July/August, has survived at least once on Stob Coire Easain (A Watson) and in 2015 on Stob Coire an Laoigh.
 Ben Alder range. Snow has survived at Geal-Charn on multiple occasions, most recently in 2015.

Starting in 2009, and for 120 months consecutively, someone has been able to find snow for skiing somewhere in Scotland.

The Cairngorms

As well as containing five of the highest mountains in the United Kingdom, the Cairngorms is the range where snow persists longest, and in more locations, than anywhere else in the UK. Ben Macdui, Cairn Gorm and Braeriach all contain long-lying patches that have been observed for many years.

Lying at the north-eastern shoulder of Cairn Gorm is Ciste Mhearad. This hollow contains a patch which, hitherto, was known to persist through many years, but has done so only once (in 2015) since 2000. Observations in 2007 and 2008 revealed that September was the month when final melting occurred for this patch.

Braeriach's Garbh Choire Mòr is the place which contains Britain's most persistent snow beds. Snow has been absent from this corrie just nine times in the last century, four of them in the last decade: 1933, 1959, 1996, 2003, 2006, 2017, 2018, 2021, and 2022. It has been claimed that Garbh Choire Mòr (as well as Coire an Lochain in the northern corries) may have contained a glacier as recently as the 19th century.

In 1994, the Cairngorms and surrounding mountains of north-east Scotland had 55 surviving patches, an exceptional number.

Ben Nevis range 

As already noted, Ben Nevis has long been known to hold snow late into the year. However, historical reports from the 19th century and early 20th century of snow being ever present on the mountain are virtually impossible to substantiate, so must remain speculative. Nevertheless, what is certainly true is that snow often persists from one winter to the next. Analysis of Ben Nevis's snow is not as comprehensive as that of the Cairngorms, but recent observations show that Ben Nevis has been snow-free only once since 2006 (in 2017). The slightly lower patch at Point 5 gully has also been known to survive from one winter to the next.

Aonach Mòr has a corrie known to hold snow from one year to the next: Coire an Lochain. One of these patches, sitting behind a protalus rampart, sometimes survives longer than the patch slightly higher up against the tall cliffs.

Below the cliffs of the north-east ridge on Aonach Beag there is a relatively little known snow-patch which, despite its low altitude (approximately  ), has been Scotland's largest at the time of the arrival of the lasting new winter snows of 2007 and 2008.  This patch does not appear in known literature on the subject and this suggests that it is very much under-recorded, which may be because it cannot readily be seen, even from the top of Aonach Mòr or Aonach Beag.

See also
Corrie
Newman's Lady-fern – a snow-tolerant species endemic to Scotland.
Icy Rock-moss – a species found in Cairngorms National Park, where it's typically found on rocks in burns fed by snow patches.
 Younger Dryas

References

External links
 Video interview with Dr Adam Watson about Cairngorm snow-patches
Scottish mountain snow melting Speculative BBC feature discussing snow-patch melt and how it may affect mosses, liverworts and birds in the Scottish hills
Cairngorms Skiing, Feith Buidhe Exploration then ski-ing of a large remaining snow patch at the Feith Buidhe slabs, probably August 1993
Tower Gully, Ben Nevis Video of Tower Gully being skied on 1 July 1994, showing the phenomenal accumulations of snow that year
flickr archive Various years' images, as contributed by several people (Dr Adam Watson, Iain Cameron, www.winterhighland.info)
Seeking the Sphinx – Scotland's Vanishing Snow Patches UKC article by Iain Cameron

Environment of Scotland
Glaciology
Mountains and hills of Scotland
Scotland
Weather events in Scotland